Benjamin Oliver Davis Sr. (July 1, 1877 – November 26, 1970) was a United States Army general. In 1940, he became the first African-American to rise to the rank of brigadier general. He was the father of Air Force General Benjamin O. Davis Jr. According to historian Russell Weigley, his career is significant not for his personal accomplishments, because he was only allowed a limited range of responsibilities, but as an indicator of a small forward movement for African Americans in the United States Army in the World War II era. The New Deal era of Franklin D. Roosevelt was favorable toward African Americans, and in 1940 he appointed Davis as the first Black general. During World War II, Davis held troubleshooting staff assignments designed to assist the expanded role of African Americans, albeit in segregated units.

Early life and education

Davis was born in Washington, D.C., the third child of Louis P. H. Davis and Henrietta (née Stewart) Davis. Biographer Marvin Fletcher has presented evidence that Davis was born on May 28, 1880, citing a June 1880 census document. Fletcher concluded that Davis lied about his age so that he could enlist in the Army without the permission of his parents. The birth date that appears on Davis's gravestone at Arlington National Cemetery is July 1, 1877, the date he provided to the Army.

Davis attended M Street High School in Washington, where he participated in the cadet program, in which city high schools organized military drill and ceremony teams that competed against each other. Davis attained the rank of captain as commander of Cadet Company B. During his senior year of high school he took courses at Howard University. His father, a messenger for the Interior Department, and his mother, a nurse, urged him to enroll in college after high school. Against his parents' wishes, he determined to pursue a military career.

Career

After graduating from high school, in response to the start of the Spanish–American War, Davis entered the military service on July 13, 1898, as a temporary first lieutenant in the 8th United States Volunteer Infantry, an all-African-American unit. This regiment was stationed at Chickamauga Park, Georgia, from October 1898 until the unit was disbanded in March 1899. During the war, Davis briefly served in Company D, 1st Separate Battalion of the Washington D.C. National Guard.

Davis was mustered out on March 6, 1899, and on June 18, 1899, he enlisted as a private in Troop I, 9th Cavalry Regiment (one of the original Buffalo Soldier regiments), of the Regular Army. At his post in Fort Duchesne, Utah, he served first as the troop's clerk and later as squadron sergeant major through 1900. In late 1900, Davis's unit was commanded by Lieutenant Charles Young, the only African-American officer serving in the US military at that time. Young encouraged Davis's ambition to become an officer. Young tutored Davis in all of the subjects that were covered in the officer candidate test, especially mathematics, which had been the most difficult subject Young had encountered at the United States Military Academy at West Point. In early 1901 Davis passed the test at Fort Leavenworth, Kansas, his highest score coming in the math section. (A second African American, John E. Green, passed the test along with 10 other soldiers.) On February 2, 1901, Davis was commissioned a second lieutenant of Cavalry in the Regular Army.

In the spring of 1901, Troop I was posted overseas to serve in the Philippine–American War. In August 1901, Davis was assigned to Troop F, 10th Cavalry, where he assumed the duties of a second lieutenant. Troop F returned to the US in August 1902. Davis was then stationed at Fort Washakie, Wyoming, where he also served for several months with Troop M. In September 1905, he was assigned to the traditionally Black Wilberforce College in Ohio as Professor of Military Science and Tactics, a post that he filled for four years.

In November 1909, shortly after being ordered to Regimental Headquarters, 9th Cavalry, Davis was reassigned for duty to Liberia. He left the United States for Liberia in April 1910, and served as a military attaché reporting on Liberia's military forces until October 1911. He returned to the United States in November 1911. In January 1912, Davis was assigned to Troop I, 9th Cavalry, stationed at Fort D. A. Russell, Wyoming. In 1913, the 9th Cavalry was assigned to patrol the Mexican-United States border.

In February 1915, Davis was again assigned to Wilberforce College as Professor of Military Science and Tactics. From 1917 to 1920, Davis was assigned to the 9th Cavalry at Fort Stotsenburg, Philippine Islands, as supply officer, commander of the 3rd Squadron, and then of the 1st Squadron. He reached the temporary rank of lieutenant colonel but returned to the United States in March 1920 with the rank of captain.

Davis was assigned to the traditionally Black Tuskegee Institute (now Tuskegee University) in Tuskegee, Alabama, as the professor of military science and tactics from 1920 to 1924. He then served for five years as an instructor with 2nd Battalion, 372nd Regiment, Ohio National Guard, in Cleveland, Ohio. In September 1929, Davis returned to Wilberforce as a professor of military science and tactics. He was assigned to the Tuskegee Institute in the early part of 1931 and remained there for six years as a professor of military science and tactics. During the summer months of 1930 to 1933, Davis escorted pilgrimages of World War I Gold Star mothers and widows to the burial places of their loved ones in Europe.

In August 1937, Davis returned to Wilberforce University as a professor of military science and tactics. Davis was assigned to the 369th Regiment, New York National Guard, during the summer of 1938, and took command of the regiment a short time later. Davis was promoted to brigadier general on October 25, 1940, becoming the first African-American general officer in the United States Army.

World War II

Davis became commanding general of the 4th Cavalry Brigade, 2nd Cavalry Division at Fort Riley, Kansas, in January 1941. About six months later, he was assigned to Washington, D.C. as an assistant in the Office of the Inspector General. While serving in the Office of the Inspector General, Davis also served on the Advisory Committee on Negro Troop Policies. From 1941 to 1944, Davis conducted inspection tours of African-American soldiers in the United States Army. From September to November 1942 and again from July to November 1944, Davis made inspection tours of African-American soldiers stationed in Europe.

On November 10, 1944, Davis was reassigned to work under Lieutenant General John C. H. Lee as special assistant to the commanding general, Communications Zone, European Theater of Operations. He served with the General Inspectorate Section, European Theater of Operation (later the Office of the Inspector General in Europe) from January through May 1945. While serving in the European Theater of Operations, Davis was influential in the proposed policy of integration using replacement units.

Later Life and Death
After serving in the European Theater of Operations for more than a year, Davis returned to Washington, D.C. as an assistant to the Inspector General. In 1947 he was assigned special assistant to the Secretary of the Army. In this capacity, he was again sent to Liberia in July 1947 as a representative of the United States for the African country's centennial celebration.

On July 20, 1948, after fifty years of military service, Davis retired in a public ceremony with President Harry S. Truman presiding. Six days later on July 26, 1948, President Truman issued Executive Order 9981 which abolished racial discrimination in the United States armed forces.

From July 1953 through June 1961, Davis served as a member of the American Battle Monuments Commission.

Davis died on November 26, 1970, at Great Lakes Naval Hospital in Chicago, Illinois, and was buried with his wife Sade Overton at Arlington National Cemetery.

Legacy
In 1997, the U.S. Postal Service issued a 32-cent stamp honoring Davis.

In the 2022 British film The Railway Children Return the character of General Harrison, an African American US Army General who lied about his age in order to join the US Army is based on Benjamin O. Davis Sr.

Personal Life
Davis married Elnora Dickerson in 1902—the two had known each other as neighbors for many years. Their first child was born in 1905, daughter Olive Davis. A son, Benjamin O. Davis Jr., was born in 1912. In early 1916, a second daughter was born, but Elnora Davis died a few days later from complications of childbirth; daughter Elnora Davis was named for her. Without a mother for the children, Davis relied upon the child's grandparents in Washington, D.C. for childcare while he was serving a tour of duty in the Philippines. In 1919 Davis married Sarah "Sadie" Overton, an English teacher at Wilberforce University. They were married for 47 years, the partnership ending at Sadie's death on October 25, 1966.

Davis's son and namesake became the first black general officer of the United States Air Force in October 1954.

Awards and Honors
United States military awards
 Distinguished Service Medal
 Bronze Star Medal
 Spanish War Service Medal
 Philippine Campaign Medal
 Mexican Border Service Medal
 World War I Victory Medal
 American Defense Service Medal
 American Campaign Medal
 European-African-Middle Eastern Campaign Medal
 World War II Victory Medal
 Army of Occupation Medal

Foreign awards
 Commander of the Order of the Star of Africa (Liberia)
 Croix de Guerre with Palm (France)

Distinguished Service Medal Citation
General Davis was awarded the Distinguished Service Medal (DSM) by General Order 10, dated February 22, 1945. The War Department press release about General Davis' DSM issued on February 11, 1945, included the following citation:

Other Honors
In 1943 General Davis was awarded the honorary degree of LL.D. (Doctor of Laws) from Atlanta University in Atlanta, Georgia.

Dates of Rank

See Also

 List of African American firsts

References

Further reading
 
 Kranz, Rachel, and Philip Koslow, eds. Biographical Dictionary of African Americans (Facts on File, 1999)
 
 Jones, Jeffery. "Benjamin O. Davis Sr., America's First Black General: The Paradox of Racial Leadership and the Military Profession." (PhD Dissertation, University of Memphis, 2019) excerpt.
 Weigley, Russell F. "Davis, Benjamin Oliver Sr." in John A. Garraty, ed. Encyclopedia of American Biography (1974) pp. 256–257.

External Links
 General Ben Davis: An Inspiration To All, US Army
 Benjamin O. Davis Sr. Collection US Army Heritage & Education Center, Carlisle, Pennsylvania
 Arlington National Cemetery

Year of birth unknown
1970 deaths
Recipients of the Distinguished Service Medal (US Army)
Burials at Arlington National Cemetery
Howard University alumni
Wilberforce University faculty
Recipients of the Croix de Guerre (France)
1880 births
United States Army personnel of World War I
Military personnel from Washington, D.C.
American expatriates in Liberia
African Americans in World War I
African Americans in World War II
United States Army generals of World War II
United States Army generals
African-American United States Army personnel